The Deepak class is a class of fleet replenishment tankers of the Indian Navy built by Fincantieri. Two ships were ordered and the first one joined the fleet on 21 January 2011, while the second joined on 1 October 2011.

History
INS Deepak construction programme by Muggiano Shipyard of Fincantieri, involved three different shipyards of Fincantieri, Italy, in a challenging time frame of two years. The ship is in double hull configuration which provides greater safety against accidental oil spillages in accordance with latest MARPOL regulations.

Costs and offset clause
Fincantieri announced in October 2008 that it won an order to build a fleet tanker, with an option for another, against competitive bidding from leading international players, especially from Russia and Korea. The contract, worth about 139 million euro includes a second vessel under an option clause which was signed in March 2009. According to an interview published in Defenseworld.net in May 2009, senior BEL executives stated that as part of the offsets for the first fleet tanker, Fincantieri, in 2008, placed an order worth 14.3 million euros for the supply of Composite Communication System, Versatile Communication System, ESM System, Electric Opto Fire Control System and their integration on board the fleet tanker. Bharat Electronics (BEL) will implement this order in 2009.

Ships of the class

On 12 February 2010, the first ship of the class  was launched. The CAG (Comptroller and Auditor General) reported that substandard steel was chosen which helped Fincantieri to bag the contract quoting lower cost. On 21 January 2011, INS Deepak was commissioned in a ceremony at the Naval Dockyard, Mumbai by the Defence Minister of India.

 is the second Deepak-class fleet tanker. It was launched on 11 October 2010 and commissioned on 1 October 2011.

Gallery

See also
Aditya-class auxiliary ship
Komandarm Fedko class oiler
HSL-class fleet support ship

References

External links 

Video

 
Auxiliary replenishment ship classes